Clive Clark  may refer to:

 Clive Clark (golfer) (born 1945), English golfer
 Clive Clark (footballer) (1940–2014), English former footballer

See also
 Clive Clarke (born 1980), Irish footballer